Gbedikpe Emmanuel Amouzou (born 28 January 1954) is a former Togolese cyclist. He competed in the individual road race at the 1972 Summer Olympics.

References

External links
 

1954 births
Living people
Togolese male cyclists
Olympic cyclists of Togo
Cyclists at the 1972 Summer Olympics
Place of birth missing (living people)
21st-century Togolese people